The 2013 Baltic Futsal Cup was held from December 6 to 8, 2013 in Latvia. Latvia won the tournament.

Standings

Matches

Awards

References

External links 
Futsal Planet

2013
2013 in Lithuanian football
2013 in Latvian football
2013 in Estonian football
International futsal competitions hosted by Latvia
2013–14 in European futsal